Shoreditch (St Leonard) was an ancient parish in the county of Middlesex. It was both a civil parish, used for administrative purposes, and an ecclesiastical parish of the Church of England. The parish church is St Leonard's, Shoreditch, often simply called "Shoreditch Church".

Civil parish

The civil parish was within the Ossulstone hundred and, from the 17th century, the Tower division. It was entrusted with various administrative functions from the 17th century. In 1837 it became a Poor Law parish, with its own workhouse. The vestry also had responsibility for highways and burials. In 1855 the parish was included in the area of the Metropolitan Board of Works, and the vestry elected two members of the board.

Under the Metropolis Management Act 1855 any parish that exceeded 2,000 ratepayers was to be divided into wards; as such the incorporated vestry of St Leonard Shoreditch was divided into eight wards (electing vestrymen): No. 1 or Moorfields (18), No. 2 or Church (21), No. 3 or Hoxton (21), No. 4 or Wenlock (18), No. 5 or Whitmore (12), No. 6 or Kingsland (12), No. 7 or Haggerstone (9) and  No. 8 or Acton (9).

In 1889 the parish was included in the new County of London, and in 1899 the civil vestry were dissolved, and the parish became the Metropolitan Borough of Shoreditch.

The civil parish covered . The populations recorded in National Censuses were:

Shoreditch St Leonard's Vestry 1801–1899

The precursor of the Saint Leonard's workhouse was housed in several houses in Hoxton.  In 1731, that site housed 84 inmates.  Saint Leonard's new, three-story workhouse (with infirmary and apothecary) was opened in 1777, thanks to a levy tax passed by an Act of Parliament in 1774.  The Shoreditch Vestry built this workhouse on the Parish Poor Trustees' "Land of Promise," on Kingsland Road.

St. Leonard's parish actually circumvented the 1834 Poor Law Amendment Act, because it was administered under its own Act.  In 1847, a sub-committee of Parliament found the conditions in the workhouse to be very poor.

Ecclesiastical parish

St Leonard's parish was within the Diocese of London. As the population increased the parish was divided:
 In 1830 the areas of Haggerston and Hoxton were constituted as separate parishes.
 In 1841 a new parish of "St James, Curtain Road" was created.
 In 1848 part of Saint Leonard's parish helped to form the parish of "St Mark, Old Street".
 In 1862 St Leonard's parish was again divided to create the parish of "Shoreditch, St Michael".
 In 1866 a new parish of "Shoreditch, Holy Trinity" was formed from part of Saint Leonard's and part of neighbouring Bethnal Green.
 In 1872 the parish of "Shoreditch, St Agatha" was created from part of Saint James, Curtain Road.

Later decreases in population led to a number of these parishes being combined in the 20th century. For instance, in 1915 Saint Agatha's parish was absorbed by St James, and in 1972 a merged parish of "Shoreditch, St Leonard with St Michael" was formed.

The names of some of the ecclesiastical parishes were used to give names to wards of the Metropolitan Borough of Shoreditch

Sources

 Guide to the Local Administrative Units of England, Vol.1, Frederic Youngs, London, 1979

History of the London Borough of Hackney
Religion in the London Borough of Hackney
Parishes governed by vestries (Metropolis)
Former civil parishes in London
Bills of mortality parishes